Günter Figal (born July 15, 1949) is a German philosopher and professor of philosophy at University of Freiburg. He is a specialist in the thought of Hans-Georg Gadamer, and Martin Heidegger. His research focuses on hermeneutics, phenomenology, German classical philosophy and the history of metaphysics. Figal was the president of the Martin-Heidegger-Society between 2003 and 2015.

Bibliography
 Aesthetics as Phenomenology: The Appearance of Things (Studies in Continental Thought), Günter Figal (Author), Translated by Jerome Veith
 The Heidegger Reader (Studies in Continental Thought), Günter Figal (Editor), Jerome Veith (Translator) 
 Simplicity. On a Bowl by Young-Jae Lee, Günter Figal (Author) 
 Theodor W. Adorno. Das Naturschöne als spekulative Gedankenfigur. Bouvier, Bonn 1977, .
 Martin Heidegger. Phänomenologie der Freiheit. 3. Auflage. Beltz, Frankfurt am Main 1988, .
 Neuauflage: Martin Heidegger. Phänomenologie der Freiheit. Mohr Siebeck, Tübingen 2013, .
 Martin Heidegger zur Einführung. 5. unveränderte Auflage. Junius, Hamburg 2007, .
 Für eine Philosophie von Freiheit und Streit: Politik – Ästhetik – Metaphysik. Metzler, Stuttgart / Weimar 1994, .
 Sokrates. 3. Auflage. Beck, München 2006, .
 Der Sinn des Verstehens. Beiträge zur hermeneutischen Philosophie. Reclam, Stuttgart 1996, .
 Nietzsche. Eine philosophische Einführung. Reclam, Stuttgart 1999, .
 Lebensverstricktheit und Abstandnahme. „Verhalten zu sich“ im Anschluß an Heidegger, Kierkegaard und Hegel. Attempto, Tübingen 2001, .
 Gegenständlichkeit. Das Hermeneutische und die Philosophie. Mohr Siebeck, Tübingen 2006, .
 Verstehensfragen. Studien zur phänomenologisch-hermeneutischen Philosophie. Mohr Siebeck, Tübingen 2009, .
 Erscheinungsdinge. Ästhetik als Phänomenologie. Mohr Siebeck, Tübingen 2010, .
 Kunst. Philosophische Abhandlungen. Mohr, Tübingen 2012. .
 Einfachheit. Über eine Schale von Young-Jae Lee. Modo, Freiburg 2014, (zweisprachig deutsch/englisch).
 Unscheinbarkeit. Der Raum der Phänomenologie. Mohr Siebeck, Tübingen 2015, unveränderte Studienausgabe 2016, .
 Gibt es wirklich etwas draußen? Skizze einer realistischen Phänomenologie. In: Information Philosophie, März 2016, Heft 1, S. 8–17

References

External links 
 Personal Website
 Figal at University of Freiburg

Continental philosophers
20th-century German philosophers
21st-century German philosophers
Hermeneutists
Metaphysics writers
Gadamer scholars
Heidegger scholars
Academic staff of the University of Freiburg
Heidelberg University alumni
Academic staff of the University of Tübingen
1949 births
Living people
Philosophy journal editors